Loucks is a surname. Notable people with the surname include:

Alvin Loucks (1895–1973), American football player and coach
Bunky Loucks, American politician
Ed Loucks, American football player
G. Dean Loucks (born c. 1936), American football coach
Henry Loucks, American newspaper editor and politician
Scott Loucks (born 1956), American baseball player
Steven D. Loucks (born 1961), American politician
William John Loucks (1873–1967), Canadian politician